The 1983 Kerry Senior Football Championship was the 83rd staging of the Kerry Senior Football Championship since its establishment by the Kerry County Board in 1889.

South Kerry entered the championship as the defending champions.

The final replay was played on 16 October 1983 at Austin Stack Park in Tralee, between Killarney and Feale Rangers, in what was their first ever meeting in the final. Killarney won the match by 0-10 to 1-04 to claim their second championship title overall and a first title in 34 years.

Results

Final

Championship statistics

Miscellaneous

 Killaney win their first title since 1949.
 Killaney qualify for the final for first time since 1950.

References

Kerry Senior Football Championship
1983 in Gaelic football